The Corry Rocks are a cluster of rocks at the north extremity of Gillock Island, in the Amery Ice Shelf. One of these rocks was occupied as an Australian National Antarctic Research Expeditions survey station in 1968. The group was named by the Antarctic Names Committee of Australia for M.J. Corry, leader and glaciologist of the Amery Ice Shelf party in 1968, who took part in the survey.

References
 

Rock formations of Mac. Robertson Land